Grace Academy is a private Christian university-model school located in Stallings, North Carolina. The school started back in 2000 and has grown from about 50 students to over 450 students stretching from Kindergarten-12th grade. Often described as a "home-school school", this is partly the truth because the majority of students take a few classes at Grace and take a few other classes at home or at other schools, such as Central Piedmont Community College. The format of the school is different from traditional schools. At Grace Academy, students choose up to 5 classes a day, and take those classes on Mondays and Wednesdays. Students can also choose a different set of up to 5 classes which they will attend Tuesdays and Thursdays, so all together one student can take anywhere from 1 to 10 courses. There is no school on Fridays. School days at Grace Academy last 5 hours and 45 minutes, from 8:25 to 2:00. This is so students who are taking classes at home may have plenty of time to do so. Grace Academy students only attend the school 120 days in a year, which is a drastic change from a traditional private or public school.

Curriculum
The curriculum taught at Grace Academy is from a Biblical worldview, considering the Christian Bible infallible. In science courses, for example, Young Earth creationism is taught in lieu of the evolution-based model adhered to by public schools. Grace Academy is a university-model school.

References

 Grace Academy Website

Christian schools in North Carolina
Schools in Charlotte, North Carolina
Private high schools in North Carolina
Private middle schools in North Carolina
Private elementary schools in North Carolina